The Protestant church of Augustinusga or Saint Augustine's church is a religious building in Augustinusga, Netherlands, one of the  medieval churches in Friesland.

The church was built in the 15th century and has a tower that dates from the 13th century, built out of brick. The building  was once a Roman Catholic church dedicated to Saint Augustine, becoming a Protestant church after the Protestant Reformation. It is listed as a Rijksmonument, number 7032.
The building is located on the Geawei 15.

References

Achtkarspelen
Augustinusga
Rijksmonuments in Friesland
Protestant churches in the Netherlands